Mentimeter (or Menti for short) is a Swedish company based in Stockholm that develops and maintains an eponymous app used to create presentations with real-time feedback.

Foundation and background
Based in Stockholm, Sweden, the Mentimeter app was started by Swedish entrepreneur Johnny Warström and Niklas Ingvar as a response to unproductive meetings. The initial start up budget was $500,000 raised by a group of prominent investors, including Per Appelgren in 2014, following the market's tendency to invest in Scandinavia.

The app also focuses on online collaboration for the education sector allowing students or public members to answer questions anonymously.

The app enables users to share knowledge and real-time feedback on mobile with presentations, polls or brainstorming sessions in classes, meetings, gatherings, conferences and other group activities.

Present day 
It has a freemium business model. 

Mentimeter has over 270 million users and is one of Sweden's fastest growing startups. The company also ranked #10 on 20 Fastest Growing 500 Startups Batch 16 Companies. Was ranked Stockholm's fastest growing company of the 2018 edition of the DI Gasell Award.

References

External links
 Official website
 Community reviews on AlternativeTo.net

Companies based in Stockholm
Presentation software
Mobile applications
Web applications